Mountain Scene with Bridges is an oil on oak panel painting by Flemish painter Joos de Momper.

The painting is currently housed at the Wallraf–Richartz Museum in Cologne.

References

External links
The painting at the Web Gallery of Art

16th-century paintings
17th-century paintings
Landscape paintings
Paintings by Joos de Momper
Collections of the Wallraf–Richartz Museum